is a Japanese swimmer. She competed at the 1972 Summer Olympics in the 100 m and 200 m butterfly and 4 × 100 m medley relay and won a gold medal in the 100 m butterfly. She won a bronze medal in this event at the 1973 World Aquatics Championships. In 1972 she twice broke the world record in the 100 m butterfly. After retiring from competition she worked as a swimming coach and a high school teacher. In 1989 she was inducted into the International Swimming Hall of Fame.

See also
 List of members of the International Swimming Hall of Fame

References

External links
 

1953 births
Living people
Japanese female butterfly swimmers
Olympic swimmers of Japan
Swimmers at the 1972 Summer Olympics
Olympic gold medalists for Japan
World record setters in swimming
World Aquatics Championships medalists in swimming
Asian Games medalists in swimming
Swimmers at the 1970 Asian Games
Medalists at the 1972 Summer Olympics
Olympic gold medalists in swimming
Asian Games gold medalists for Japan
Medalists at the 1970 Asian Games
20th-century Japanese women